Here's Love is a musical with a book, music, and lyrics by Meredith Willson.

Based on the 1947 film Miracle on 34th Street, it tells the tale of a skeptical young girl who doubts the existence of Santa Claus. When the real Kris Kringle is hired inadvertently to represent jolly St. Nick in the Macy's Thanksgiving Day Parade, he must convince the child and her cynical divorced mother (the department store's special events director) that he is the genuine article.

Productions
The Broadway production, directed by Stuart Ostrow and choreographed by Michael Kidd, opened on October 3, 1963 at the Shubert Theatre, and closed on July 25, 1964 after 334 performances and 2 previews. The cast included Laurence Naismith, Janis Paige, Craig Stevens, Lisa Kirk, Fred Gwynne, Kathy Cody, Michael Bennett, and Baayork Lee. The original director, Norman Jewison, was replaced by Ostrow, the producer, during rehearsals.

Per:  https://www.ibdb.com/broadway-production/heres-love-3024#Replacements:  Lead cast replacements included:  Richard Kiley as Fred Gaily from May 26, 1964 - Jul 04, 1964; Lisa Kirk as Doris Walker from May 26, 1964 - Jul 25, 1964; John Payne as Fred Gaily from Jul 06, 1964 - Jul 25, 1964.

This show had also been titled It's Beginning to Look a Lot Like Christmas and Miracle on 34th Street: The Musical. The song "It's Beginning to Look a Lot Like Christmas", written by Willson in 1951, is used in the musical, where it is sung in counterpoint to the newly-composed "Pine Cones and Holly Berries".

Synopsis 

Susan Walker and her mother, Doris, live alone in New York City in the 1960s.  Doris works in an executive position at Macy's and, at the start of the musical, is busy organizing the Macy's Thanksgiving Day Parade.  Susan meets an ex-marine named Fred Gaily, who takes it upon himself to rid her of her "realistic" outlook on life by taking her to see Santa Claus at Macy's.  Kris (Santa) manages to win Susan over while love blooms between Fred and Doris.  The second act sees Kris appearing in the New York Supreme Court, with Fred helping him defend his sanity.  In the conclusion, Fred uses the Post Office to prove to the court (and the world) that Santa Claus does exist: Kris Kringle is he.

Original Broadway cast and characters 
Valerie Lee – Susan Walker
Janis Paige – Doris Walker
Laurence Naismith – Kris Kringle (Santa)
Craig Stevens – Fred Gaily
Fred Gwynne – Mr. Shellhammer
Paul Reed – Mr. Macy
Kathy Cody – Hendrika

Song list
Broadway

Act I
 The Big Clown Balloons – Paradesters
 Arm in Arm – Doris Walker and Susan Walker
 You Don't Know – Doris Walker
 The Plastic Alligator – Marvin Shellhammer and Clerks
 The Bugle – Mr. Kris Kringle and Hendrika
 Here's Love – Mr. Kris Kringle, Fred Gaily, Customers, Clerks, Employees and Children
 My Wish – Fred Gaily and Susan Walker
 Pine Cones and Holly Berries/It's Beginning to Look a Lot Like Christmas – Mr. Kris Kringle, Doris Walker and Marvin Shellhammer
 Look, Little Girl – Fred Gaily
 Look, Little Girl (Reprise) – Doris Walker
 Expect Things to Happen – Mr. Kris Kringle

Act II
 Pine Cones and Holly Berries/It's Beginning to Look a Lot Like Christmas (Reprise) – Mr. Kris Kringle and Susan Walker
 She Hadda Go Back – Fred Gaily and Marines
 That Man Over There – R. H. Macy
 My State – Doris Walker, R. H. Macy, Marvin Shellhammer, Tammany O'Halloran and Judge Martin Group
 Nothing in Common – Doris Walker
 That Man Over There (Reprise) – Court Personnel and Spectators

References

External links
 Here's Love at guidetomusicaltheatre.com
 

1963 musicals
Broadway musicals
Christmas musicals
Miracle on 34th Street
Musicals based on films
Musicals by Meredith Willson
Plays set in New York City
Santa Claus in fiction